Tock-tock or tock tock can refer to

 Claves - a percussion instrument consisting of a pair of short, thick dowels.
 Steelpan - a pitched percussion instrument, also known as a steel drum
 Any of several types of beetle of the family Tenebrionidae